"Everyday" is a song by written and performed by Toby Lightman, issued as the second single from her debut studio album Little Things. The song was used during the sixth season of the FOX television series Bones, in the episode "The Couple in the Cave".

References

External links
 

2003 songs
2004 singles
Lava Records singles
Toby Lightman songs
Songs written by Toby Lightman